Basic Ali is a Bangladeshi comic strip written and illustrated by Shahrier Khan, first published on November 26, 2006, on The Daily Prothom Alo. It has been adapted into a TV series on Channel I and renewed for a third season in February 2018.

History 
Basic Ali was launched on 26 November 2006 as a strip on the Prothom Alo in the editorial page.

Story 
The story is surrendered around Ali family. Basic Ali is the oldest son of the family. His father is Talib Ali, a prominent loan defaulter, owner of Ali Group of Industries, and his mother is a housewife named Molly Ali. His little sister is Necher who is a medical student and his little brother named Magic is a school student. Outside the family, Basic's close friend, Hillol, and Basic's press office colleague Riya Haque, are also frequently turned around.

Media

Television 
Casting for a TV show based on Basic Ali started in 2017 and it was the first comic character in Bangladesh to be adapted on the screen. After the end of season one it was renewed for season two.

Characters 

 Besic Ali: the main character of this cartoon. He's a university graduate who is lazy by nature.
 Talib Ali: Basic Ali's father.
 Molly Ali: Ali's mother sometimes addressed as ''Madest''
 Necher Ali: Basic Ali's younger sister who is a medical student.
 Magic: Basic Ali's younger brother. A brilliant student even he use to play football and cricket the whole day.
 Hillol: Basic Ali's friend.
 Riya Haque: Basic Ali's love interest and office colleague.

References 

2006 comics debuts
Comics set in the 21st century